Réde is a village in Kisbér District of Komárom-Esztergom County in Hungary.

It was property of the Cseszneky, later of the Esterházy family.

External links
 Street map (Hungarian)

Populated places in Komárom-Esztergom County